Juan Pablo de Aragón-Azlor y Zapata de Calatayud, 11th Duke of Villahermosa, 6th Duke of Palata, GE (24 January 1730 – 17 September 1790), was a Spanish peer and diplomat. He was a knight of the Order of the Golden Fleece and of the Order of Charles III.

Biography

Family origins

Juan Pablo was born the 24 January 1730, son of Juan José de Aragón-Azlor, who was the 3rd Count of Guara, brother of José Claudio de Aragón-Gurrea, 10th Duke of Villahermosa. His mother was Inés Zapata de Calatayud, daughter of the Counts of Real. Through the death with no descendants of his uncle in 1760, he inherited all of his titles. Before inheriting the dukedom, he was already the 4th Count of Guara, 8th Count of Luna, 11th Count of Cortes, Baron of Panzano, 14th Lord of La Zaida in Zaragoza, etc.

Early years

During his time as attaché to the Embassy of Spain in France and in his forties, he married the ambassador's daughter, María Manuela Pignatelli y Gonzaga (her father was Joaquín Atanasio Pignatelli de Aragón y Moncayo, 16th Count of Fuentes and her mother María Luisa Gonzaga, close relatives of Saint Joseph Pignatelli).

In 1772, Juan Pablo left the embassy in Paris, where his father-in-law was ambassador, and went first to London and then to Madrid, from where he was sent abroad for fear of his possible influence in the royal family. He was ambassador of Spain to the Kingdom of Sardinia from 1779 to 1783.

Later years

Juan Pablo was a prominent member of the "Aragonese party" around Charles III, a Francophile and Voltairean party, intellectually led by Pedro Pablo Abarca de Bolea, 10th Count of Aranda, the notable military officer and politician who was successor to Pignatelli at the Embassy in Paris, and who was ambassador to France for fourteen years, from 1773 to 1787. He financially and politically supported, through Benjamin Franklin, the United States Inderpendance, and prior to that was ambassador in Poland and England.

In 1777 there was a real estate sale in Madrid, which opened the doors to real estate reforms and changes by the Dukes of Villahermosa, the Azlor de Aragón-Pignatelli couple towards a conversion to a neoclassical palace which was called Palacio de Villahermosa after 1805, and which today is the current Thyssen-Bornemisza Museum, located at Paseo del Prado 8, opposite the Prado museum and the Botanical Garden.

Titles held

Dukedoms 

 11th Duke of Villahermosa (GE)
 6th Duke of Palata (GE)

Marquessates 

4th Marquess of Cábrega

Countships 

8th Count of Luna
8th Count of Real
9th Count of Sinarcas
7th Count of Villamonte

See also
List of dukes in the peerage of Spain
List of current Grandees of Spain

References

1730 births
1790 deaths